The following is the list of banks in Australia, as well as restricted ADIs, credit unions, friendly societies and subsidiaries and branches of foreign banks in Australia. Financial institutions in Australia are supervised by the Australian Prudential Regulation Authority (APRA) as authorised deposit-taking institutions (ADI) under the Banking Act 1959 (Cth), as at 2 August 2017.

Central bank
Reserve Bank of Australia

Australian-owned ADIs (e.g. banks and building societies)

Restricted ADIs (Restricted Authorised Deposit-taking Institutions) 
Restricted ADIs are newly licensed ADIs within Australia.  Restricted ADIs have the same obligations as full ADIs, but are restricted to only taking a total of $2 million of customer deposits during their restricted period. To protect these deposits, Restricted ADIs are required to hold a minimum of $3 million of prudential capital, as well as a $1 million resolution reserve to resolving any legal matters (or government costs for invoking the Financial Claims Scheme).

Restricted ADIs have a two-year period to transition to being an unrestricted ADI (e.g. a full bank).  This two-year period is designed to allow Restricted ADIs to build their systems and test them with a limited number of customers (less than 100).  Once ready, the Restricted ADI can apply to APRA for the removal of restrictions, with the ADI then allowed to offer services to the general public.

Credit Unions

Australian friendly societies

Foreign-owned subsidiary banks
Foreign banks wishing to carry on a banking business in Australia must obtain a banking authority under the Banking Act 1959 issued by APRA, either to operate as a wholesale bank through an Australian branch or to conduct business through an Australian-incorporated subsidiary. Foreign banks which do not wish to obtain a banking authority may operate a representative office for liaison purposes, but the activities of that office are restricted.

There are a number of foreign subsidiary banks; however, only a few have a retail banking presence — HSBC Bank Australia, Bank of Sydney and Citibank Australia have a small number of branches. Foreign banks have a more significant presence in the Australian merchant banking sector.

Branches of foreign banks
 ABN AMRO Bank N.V.
 Bank of America, National Association
 Bank of Baroda
 Bank of China Limited
 Bank of Communications Co., Ltd.
 Barclays Capital (the trading name of Barclays Bank plc)
 BNP Paribas
 China Construction Bank Corporation
 China Everbright Bank Co. Ltd.
 Credit Suisse
 DBS Bank Limited
 Deutsche Bank AG
 HBOS Treasury Services plc
 HSBC Bank plc
 ING Bank NV
 JPMorgan Chase Bank, National Association
 Mega International Commercial Bank Co., Ltd.
 Mizuho Corporate Bank, Ltd
 National Bank of Greece
 Oversea-Chinese Banking Corporation Limited
 Rabobank Nederland (the trading name of Co-operative Central Raiffeisen-Boerenleenbank B.A.)
 Royal Bank of Canada
 Société Générale
 Standard Chartered Bank
 State Bank of India
 State Street Bank and Trust Company (SSBATC)
 Sumitomo Mitsui Banking Corporation
 The Bank of Tokyo-Mitsubishi UFJ, Ltd
 The Hongkong and Shanghai Banking Corporation Limited
 The Northern Trust Company
 The Royal Bank of Scotland Plc
 Taishin International Bank
 Taiwan Business Bank
Taiwan Cooperative Bank
 UBS AG
 Union Bank of India
 United Overseas Bank Limited
 Woori Bank

See also

 Banking in Australia
 List of banks
 List of banks in Oceania

References

External links
 Australia's Banking History, ABC
 History of Banks, Australian Banking Association

 
Australia
Banks
Wikipedia articles in need of updating from March 2013
Australia